Euchre Creek may refer to:

Euchre Creek (Kansas), a creek in Brown County, Kansas, United States
Euchre Creek (Curry County, Oregon), United States
Euchre Creek (Lincoln County, Oregon), United States
 The Euchre Creek band of the Rogue River Native Americans in Oregon